John Michael English (born 16 December 1962) is an Australian politician. He was a Labor member of the Legislative Assembly of Queensland from 2001 to 2009, representing the district of Redlands. He was Deputy Speaker of the Parliament from 2006 to 2009 and also served on the Parliamentary Crime & Misconduct Committee and the Public Accounts Committee.

English was born in Maleny, Queensland. Prior to his election he was a police officer.

References

1962 births
Living people
Members of the Queensland Legislative Assembly
Australian Labor Party members of the Parliament of Queensland
21st-century Australian politicians